Cara Zavaleta (born June 15, 1980, in Bowling Green, Ohio) is an American model, actress, and television personality, known for her appearances on the MTV reality series Road Rules: South Pacific, and as the November 2004 Playboy Playmate.

Reality television career
Zavaleta was a cast member of MTV's reality show Road Rules during the Road Rules: South Pacific season. During the season, she was voted off by her team and replaced by Tina Barta.

Zavaleta was originally cast as part of the alumni team in 2007 Road Rules 2007: Viewers' Revenge, but dropped out before filming began. She was replaced by Susie Meister. She has also participated on several of Real World/Road Rules Challenges including Real World/Road Rules Challenge: The Gauntlet, which she won, Real World/Road Rules Challenge: The Gauntlet 2, and Real World/Road Rules Challenge: The Inferno III.

Playboy
After her stint on Road Rules, she posed for Playboy, becoming the Playboy Playmate for November 2004, after calling them to ask if they were interested in her.

Personal life 

On December 23, 2010, Zavaleta announced on her official YouTube page that she and her boyfriend were expecting their first child together, a boy due at the end of March 2011. To be closer to her immediate family, Cara moved back to Chicago in the Fall of 2010.

Filmography

References

External links

1980 births
Living people
American actresses
American people of Basque descent
People from Bowling Green, Ohio
2000s Playboy Playmates
Road Rules cast members
The Challenge (TV series) contestants
21st-century American women